The Era of Fragmentation was an era of disunity in Tibetan history lasting from the death of the Tibetan Empire's last emperor, Langdarma, in 842 until Drogön Chögyal Phagpa became the Imperial Preceptor of the three provinces of Tibet in 1253, under the Yuan dynasty. During this period, the political unity of the Tibetan Empire collapsed following a civil war between Yumtän (Yum brtan) and Ösung (’Od-srung), after which followed numerous rebellions against the remnants of imperial Tibet and the rise of regional warlords.

Civil war and the decline of imperial Tibet 

The last emperor of the unified Tibetan Empire, Langdarma, was assassinated in 842–846, by either a Buddhist hermit or a monk named Pelgyi Dorje of Lhalung. The assassination left two possible heirs, Yumtän and Ösung, to fight for the throne, leading to a civil war. The successors of Ösung controlled the region of Ngari, while the successors of Yumtän controlled the Ü region. The son of Ösung was Pälkhortsän (865–895 or 893–923), who would sire two sons, Trashi Tsentsän and Thrikhyiding, also called Kyide Nyigön in some sources. Thrikhyiding migrated to the western Tibetan region of upper Ngari (Stod Mnga ris) and married a woman of high central Tibetan nobility, with whom he founded a local dynasty that would go on to create the kingdoms of Purang-Guge, Maryul, and Zanskar.  This civil war weakened the political authority of the Tibetan monarchy, dissolving Tibet into separate tribes and small kingdoms.

Revolts and warlords
The dissolution of a centralized empire allowed Tibetan peasants, dissatisfied with the political turmoil, to rebel against regional governments. These uprisings split imperial Tibet into a multitude of separate, autonomous kingdoms, each ruled by a local warlord. The warlords constantly fought for political dominance, utilizing private armies and military fortresses. Between 842 and 1247, no central authority was in control of Tibet and small kingdoms like Guge and Maryul (Ladakh) emerged. The period ended with the Mongol conquest of Tibet and subsequent Yuan rule of Tibet.

Traditional accounts of the period focus on religion. The Era of Fragmentation is depicted as a low point in the development of Tibetan Buddhism, with the Buddhist monastic order facing persecution and exile. Monastic Buddhism was alleged to have only persevered in Amdo, then largely dominated by non-Tibetan peoples, and would not be conquered by a Tibetan polity until the 10th century.

According to this account, during the reign of Langdarma, three monks fled to Mount Dantig in Amdo.  Their disciple Muzu Selbar, later known as the scholar Gongpa Rapsel (953-1035), was responsible for the renewal of Buddhism in northeastern Tibet. The students of Rapsal are said to have returned to Ü-Tsang, where they re-introduced monastic Buddhism. Modern historians contest traditional views of the era, arguing that Buddhism was in fact widespread during the period, and that regional political authorities shared a close relationship with Buddhist monastic leaders.

See also
 Ladakh Chronicles

References

Citations

Sources 
 

 

History of Tibet
9th century in Tibet
10th century in Tibet
11th century in Tibet
Civil wars involving the states and peoples of Asia
Civil wars of the Middle Ages
9th-century conflicts
10th-century conflicts
11th-century conflicts
Historical eras